Presidente Kennedy is a coastal municipality located in the southernmost portion Brazilian state of Espírito Santo. It is located at 55 meters above sea level. It was named after U.S. president John F. Kennedy, in a tribute to his persona. The city received donations from Alliance for Progress plan.

In recent years, an oil well was discovered in the ocean just in front of the city who was awarded with a heat economy. The oil is under the pre-salt layer. Companies such as the Chinese Baosteel operate in the city, and a new seaport is under construction.

See also  
 Alliance for Progress
 Presidente Kennedy, Tocantins
 List of memorials to John F. Kennedy

References

External links
 Official Government Website

Municipalities in Espírito Santo
Populated coastal places in Espírito Santo